Junction transistor usually means bipolar junction transistor.  It may also refer to:

 Grown-junction transistor
 Alloy-junction transistor
 Unijunction transistor
 JFET (junction field-effect transistor)